FIFA 15 is a football simulation video game developed by EA Canada and published by Electronic Arts under the EA Sports label. It was released on 23 September 2014 in North America, 25 September in Europe and 26 September in the United Kingdom and Ireland for the PlayStation 3, PlayStation 4, PlayStation Vita, Nintendo 3DS, Wii, Xbox One, Xbox 360, Microsoft Windows, iOS, Android and Windows Phone. On PC for the first time, FIFA 15 runs on EA's Ignite engine with the same features as the PlayStation 3 and Xbox 360 editions.  This is the final game in the FIFA series to be available on the Nintendo 3DS, Nintendo Wii and PlayStation Vita, as well as the last game published by Electronic Arts for the former.

The game features Lionel Messi on its cover, alongside  different players in different parts of the world, and is the first game in the FIFA series to be fully licensed by the Premier League. FIFA 15 received positive reviews across all platforms, although the PC version in particular was criticized for the amount of bugs that were featured at release.

For the third consecutive edition, the main commentators for the game are Martin Tyler and Alan Smith.

Ultimate Team 

FIFA 15s Ultimate Team introduced a new feature, in which users can sign loan players for a limited duration of matches. Another new feature is The Concept Squad, where players are given access to the game's database and can create a "dream squad". The concept players card is grey colored. A number of new legends are also introduced to the game, including Franz Beckenbauer, Roberto Carlos, Peter Schmeichel and Hristo Stoichkov which are only available on Xbox One and Xbox 360.

Goal celebrations 
New goal celebrations featured in the game include Luis Suárez's 'kiss the wrist' routine, Zlatan Ibrahimović kicking the corner flag, and Cristiano Ronaldo's celebration from his second goal vs Sweden in the qualifying play-offs for the 2014 World Cup where he raises both arms and points downwards.

Licensing 
A demo was released on 9 September 2014, with three new teams – Chelsea, Liverpool and Napoli – alongside the previous game's demo's teams: Borussia Dortmund, FC Barcelona, Manchester City, Boca Juniors and Paris Saint-Germain.

A full list of the game's leagues, clubs and national teams was published on its official website on 18 September with the description "Experience true football authenticity with FIFA 15 – featuring 35 licensed leagues, over 600 clubs, 16,000+ players and 41 licensed stadiums".

EA Sports had signed a deal with the Premier League as the Official Sports Technology Partner. In this way EA are licensed under Premier League development. This deal allows all 20 Premier League stadiums to be included in the game, including the seven stadiums from FIFA 14. Official Premier League scoreboards and television graphics are also in the game, as well as real-life referees, chants and advertising hoardings.

The Italian Serie A is fully licensed in FIFA 15. All Serie B teams except the three relegated from the 2013–14 Serie A, and several Argentine clubs, feature with generic crests and kits. The Campeonato Brasileiro Série A and Brazilian clubs are not licensed, due to a failure to reach agreement with the rights holders, but the Turkish Süper Lig returns to the series. The Brazil national football team feature in the game, despite the domestic league not being included.

One of the new features added for FIFA 15 is that all 20 Premier League stadiums are included and officially licensed. On 19 September a list of stadiums in the game was published on its website, alongside 31 generic stadiums.

Lionel Messi returns as the main cover star for all regions on the global cover. Messi has starred on the cover of all instalments of the FIFA franchise since FIFA 13, when he replaced Wayne Rooney. Some regions also have a player from that region starring on the cover with Messi. Nintendo's platforms may not have localised variants of the game cover available, or feature an additional player, in select regions.

Reception 

FIFA 15 received generally positive reviews from critics. Review aggregation website GameRankings provides an average rating of 81.57% based on 15 reviews for the PlayStation 4 version. The Xbox One version received a similar average of 82.17% based on 12 reviews, and the PC version 64.00% based on 2 reviews. Another review aggregation website Metacritic gave the PlayStation 4 version an 82/100 based on 29 reviews, the Xbox One  84/100 based on 19 reviews and the PC version 82/100 based on 5 reviews.

Chris Schilling of IGN gave the game a score of 83%, saying "FIFA 15 is still one of the best sports simulations around, with superb animation and big-match atmosphere", although finding flaws in the frequent use of cutaways and the quality of the game's artificial intelligence.

A score of 8 out of 10 was given by GameSpot writer John Robertson, who concluded "If you're looking for football that is exciting, exaggerated, and immensely entertaining, FIFA 15 is the game to get" but was critical of the game's commentary.

Steve Hannley of Hardcore Gamer gave the game a 4 out of 5, saying "Shrewdly taking advantage of current-gen's capabilities with added emotional intelligence and improved animations, this is easily the prettiest EA Sports title this year", but he criticised the "relatively unchanged" game modes.

Some users complained that their version of FIFA 15 suffered from lagging, stuttering and audio looping, as well as gameplay bugs and lighting issues. Patches have been released for the PC version of the game, fixing several bugs, but the major stuttering issue remains unresolved.

References

External links 
 

2014 video games
Android (operating system) games
Association football video games
Electronic Arts games
EA Sports games
15
IOS games
Kinect games
Nintendo 3DS games
Nintendo 3DS eShop games
Nintendo Network games
Nintendo Wi-Fi Connection games
PlayStation 3 games
PlayStation 4 games
PlayStation Move-compatible games
PlayStation Vita games
Sports video games with career mode
Video games developed in Canada
Wii games
Windows games
Xbox 360 games
Xbox One games
Multiplayer and single-player video games
Video games set in 2015
La Liga licensed video games
Interactive Achievement Award winners
D.I.C.E. Award for Sports Game of the Year winners